54th NSFC Awards
January 4, 2020

Best Film:
Parasite

The 54th National Society of Film Critics Awards, given on 4 January 2020, honored the best in film for 2019.

Winners
Winners are listed in boldface along with the runner-up positions and counts from the final round:

Best Picture
 Parasite (44)
 Little Women (27)
 Once Upon a Time in Hollywood (22)

Best Director
 Greta Gerwig – Little Women (39)
 Bong Joon-ho – Parasite (36)
 Martin Scorsese – The Irishman (31)

Best Actor
 Antonio Banderas – Pain and Glory (69)
 Adam Driver – Marriage Story (43)
 Adam Sandler – Uncut Gems (41)

Best Actress
 Mary Kay Place – Diane (40)
 Zhao Tao – Ash Is Purest White (28)
 Florence Pugh – Midsommar (25)

Best Supporting Actor
 Brad Pitt – Once Upon a Time in Hollywood (64)
 Joe Pesci – The Irishman (30)
 Wesley Snipes – Dolemite Is My Name (18)
 Song Kang-ho – Parasite (18)

Best Supporting Actress
 Laura Dern – Marriage Story and Little Women (57)
 Florence Pugh – Little Women (44)
 Jennifer Lopez – Hustlers (26)

Best Screenplay
 Bong Joon-ho and Han Jin-won – Parasite (37)
 Quentin Tarantino – Once Upon a Time in Hollywood (34)
 Greta Gerwig – Little Women (33)

Best Cinematography
 Claire Mathon – Portrait of a Lady on Fire and Atlantics (41)
 Robert Richardson – Once Upon a Time in Hollywood (29)
 Yorick Le Saux – Little Women (22)

Best Non-Fiction Film
 Honeyland – Tamara Kotevska and Ljubomir Stefanov (33)
 American Factory – Steven Bognar and Julia Reichert (28)
 Apollo 11 – Todd Douglas Miller (27)

Film Heritage Award
 "Private Lives, Public Spaces" at the Museum of Modern Art: Curated by Ron Magliozzi, this exhibit makes visible MOMA's collection of over one hundred years of vernacular moving images, most of them home movies by the famous and the unknown. Shown on multiple screens in the lobbies of MoMA's Titus theaters, they form a crazy quilt of personal and cultural history.
 Rialto Pictures, for distributing 4K restorations of beloved classics like Kind Hearts and Coronets (1949) and for presenting neglected work by international masters, such as Federico Fellini's The White Sheik (1952), and, for the first time, the uncut version of Francesco Rosi's Christ Stopped at Eboli (1979), with restored prints and upgraded subtitles.

References

External links
 Official website

2019 film awards
2019 in American cinema